In physical cosmology, the hadron epoch started 20 microseconds after the Big Bang. The temperature of the universe had fallen sufficiently to allow the quarks from the preceding quark epoch to bind together into hadrons. Initially, the temperature was high enough to allow the formation of hadron/anti-hadron pairs, which kept matter and anti-matter in thermal equilibrium. Following the annihilation of matter and antimatter, a nano-asymmetry of matter remains to the present day. Most of the hadrons and anti-hadrons were eliminated in annihilation reactions, leaving a small residue of hadrons. Upon elimination of anti-hadrons, the Universe was dominated by photons, neutrinos and electron-positron pairs. One refers to this period as the lepton epoch.

See also
 Chronology of the universe
 Big Bang
 
Physics 175: Stars and Galaxies - The Big Bang, Matter and Energy; Ithaca College, New York.

References

Physical cosmology
Big Bang